The University of Mysore (Kannada: ಮೈಸೂರು ವಿಶ್ವವಿದ್ಯಾನಿಲಯ) is a public state university in Mysore, Karnataka, India. The university was founded during the reign of Maharaja Krishnaraja Wadiyar IV and the premiership of Sir M. Visvesvaraya. The university is recognised by the University Grants Commission for offering higher studies degree courses on-campus as well as online. It was  inaugurated on 27 July 1916. Its first chancellor was the maharaja himself; the first Vice-Chancellor was H. V. Nanjundaiah. This was the first university outside of British administered Indian provinces, the sixth in the Indian subcontinent as a whole, and the first in Karnataka. It is a state university of the affiliating type, and was deemed autonomous within the Republic of India on 3 March 1956, when it gained recognition from the University Grants Commission.

The Mysore University Library comprises over 800,000 books, 2,400 journal titles, and 100,000 volumes of journals. The main campus features an amphitheater, an auditorium, a swimming pool, and hostel accommodations for men and women. As of July 2013, the University of Mysore was accredited "Grade A" by National Assessment and Accreditation Council (NAAC).

History

Recent academic restructuring
 
The International School of Information Management, was created in 2005 through the collaboration of three US universities, as well as Dalhousie University of Canada, and IIIT, Bangalore. Faculty members from these partnering institutions teach at ISiM.

The Third Sector Research Resource Centre (TSRRS) was established in 2004. The aim of the centre is '...to undertake and promote interdisciplinary [sic] studies and research in the domain of civil society,' with a secondary aim of developing and offering Diploma and Masters programs in the management of non-profit organisations.

More recently, the Department of Law in the university was incorporated into the Mysore University School of Justice (MUSJ). Continuing with the university's initiative to introduce five-year integrated courses to produce professionals with in-depth knowledge, the MUSJ has introduced a program leading to a degree in law, as a bid to enhance the quality of legal education in Karnataka. University of Mysore along with Institute of Astrophysics has signed an MoU to build a planetarium in Mysore.

Crest and motto 
The university's motto, "Na Hi Jñanena Sadrusham" (Nothing compares with knowledge) is taken from the Bhagavad Gita.

Ranking

Mysore University was ranked 19th among universities in India by the National Institutional Ranking Framework (NIRF) in 2021 and 34th overall.

Notable people

 S. V. Rajendra Singh Babu, filmmaker
 R. Indira, sociologist
 T. S. Venkannayya
 AR Krishnashastry, writer, researcher and translator
 T. S. Krishnamurthy, Chief Election Commissioner of India
 Kuvempu, writer
 R. K. Laxman, cartoonist 
 Devanur Mahadeva, writer
 N. R. Narayana Murthy, billionaire
 Nima Poovaya-Smith, museum curator, art historian and writer
 Sadhguru, philanthropist
 S. Srikanta Sastri, Indian historian, Indologist, and polyglot
 RAK Sharma, composer, singer and writer
 MV Seetharamaiah, writer
 G. S. Shivarudrappa, writer
 M. N. Venkatachaliah, Chief Justice of India
 Priyadarshini, playback singer
 Mysore Manjunath, Indian Violinist 
 Avinash, actor
 U. R. Ananthamurthy,writer

Online Programs 
The University launched several new Online Degree Programs during the COVID Pandemic, in an attempt to ensure students completing their School leaving exams in 2020-21 did not lose an Academic year due to Colleges & Universities being in lockdown. Its Programs were approved by the University Grants Commission (India) in early 2020 itself, making it one of the first Public Universities to try an initiative of this nature. The University had started projects in the field of Online Programs in 2014, partnering with University18 as a platform partner, making it an early adopter of technology in education.

See also 

 List of Heritage Buildings in Mysore
 Krishnaraja Boulevard
 Oriental Library
 Maharaja's College, Mysore

References

External links

 

 

 
University of Mysore
Educational institutions established in 1916
Universities and colleges in Mysore
Universities in Mysore
University of Mysore